The Jilin–Shulan railway, named the Jishu Railway, is a  single-track railway line in Northeast China running from Jilin to Shulan. At Jilin, which is the terminus of the Shenji Railway, it connects to the Changtu Railway and the Changhun Intercity Railway, and at Shulan it connects to the Labin Railway and the Taoshu Railway.

History
The railway line between Longtanshan and Shulan, named the Longshu Line, was originally created in 1941 by the Manchukuo National Railway, by building a new stretch of railway to connect the Jilin–Jinzhu Jinzhu Line with the Meiyao–Shulan Meiyao Line, both of which had been built by the privately owned Jilin Railway. This line was destroyed in 1945 during the Soviet invasion of Manchuria. China Railway rebuilt the line between 1958 and 1966, as the distance between Jilin and Harbin is  shorter via this route than via the Labin Railway.

Route

References

Railway lines in China
Rail transport in Jilin
Jilin City
Railway lines in Manchukuo
Railway lines opened in 1941